The 1961 Houston Oilers season was the second season for the Houston Oilers as a professional American football franchise; For the second consecutive season, the Oilers scored a triumph in the AFL championship game over the San Diego Chargers (12–2), the Western Division champions.

The Oilers started slowly in 1961, with a 1–3–1 record. After a tie on October 13 with the Boston Patriots, head coach Lou Rymkus was fired by owner Bud Adams. Wally Lemm was hired, and the team went undefeated for the remainder of the season, including the championship game, a winning streak of ten games.

The Oilers set the AFL record for points scored in 1961, with 513 (36.6 points per game). They also set an American Football League record with a +271 point differential, by allowing only 242 points. The 1961 Oilers are the only team in AFL or NFL history to score 45 points or more six times in a single season.

Offseason 
On January 14, end Willard Dewveall played out his option with the Chicago Bears of the NFL and joined the Oilers. He became the first player to move deliberately from one league to another. Dewveall was the only one to move between leagues for five years, until placekicker Pete Gogolak moved from the Buffalo Bills to the New York Giants of the NFL in 1966.

AFL Draft 

 Houston Oilers draft picks (Selected eighth)

Standings

Season schedule

Roster

Postseason

AFL Championship Game 

Houston Oilers 10, San Diego Chargers 3
December 24, 1961, at Balboa Stadium, San Diego, CaliforniaAttendance: 29,556

Scoring
 HOU – Field goal George Blanda 46
 HOU – Billy Cannon 35 pass from Blanda (Blanda kick)
 SD – Field goal Blair 12

References

External links 
 Oilers on Pro Football Reference
 Oilers on jt-sw.com

Houston Oilers
American Football League championship seasons
Houston Oilers seasons
Houston